The Plosca is a left tributary of the river Amaradia in Romania. It discharges into the Amaradia in Melinești.

References

Rivers of Romania
Rivers of Gorj County
Rivers of Dolj County